Zərnava (also, Zarnova) is a village and municipality in the Ismailli Rayon of Azerbaijan.  It has a population of 872. The municipality consists of the villages of Zərnava, Aşağı Zərnav, and Müşkəmir.

References 

Populated places in Ismayilli District